Franz Krug (26 March 1935 – 19 February 2022) was a German politician.

A member of the Christian Social Union in Bavaria, he served in the Landtag of Bavaria from 1970 to 1978. He died in February 2022, at the age of 86.

References

1935 births
2022 deaths
20th-century German politicians
21st-century German politicians
Christian Social Union in Bavaria politicians
Members of the Landtag of Bavaria
Cartellverband members
Officers Crosses of the Order of Merit of the Federal Republic of Germany
People from Amberg